Rozeta Hajdari (born June 10, 1974) is a Kosovar Albanian economist and politician, currently serving as minister of industry, entrepreneurship and trade of the Republic of Kosovo. Following a lengthy career with foreign development organizations, she joined the government as a non-partisan minister in 2020.

Education
Hajdari studied economics at the University of Prishtina and completed her master's degree at Linnaeus University in Växjö, Sweden.

Career
Hajdari worked for over two decades with international development agencies, government and business organizations in areas of economy, education, governance, public administration reform, and European integration. She was in charge of institution-building, policy planning and coordination, implementation, monitoring and evaluation. During her career, she maintained a clear vision of aid effectiveness and local ownership.

Hajdari has also taught economics and management courses at the Haxhi Zeka University in Peja and at RIT Kosovo.

In February 2020, Hajdari was appointed minister of economy, employment, trade, industry, entrepreneurship and strategic investments in the first Kurti government. As she assumed the portfolios of five former ministries, she became known as a "super minister". During her short tenure, she dismissed the directors of ten publicly owned enterprises, proposed trade reciprocity measures against Serbia, worked on a plan to collect electricity payments in northern Kosovo, and assisted with COVID-19 measures.

While she remained a non-party member, Hajdari stood as a candidate for the Vetëvendosje Movement in the 2021 parliamentary elections. She gave up her seat after the opening session to become minister of industry, entrepreneurship and trade in the second Kurti government in March 2021.

In her first year in office, Hajdari proposed 11 laws, supervised Kosovo's participation in Expo Dubai 2020, and undertook important reforms within her department. Her focus is industrial policy reform and investment promotion.

References

Living people
1974 births
Albanian economists
Kosovo Albanians
Industry ministers of Kosovo
RIT Kosovo
Linnaeus University alumni
University of Pristina alumni
Politicians from Peja